is a passenger railway station in the city of Tateyama, Chiba Prefecture, Japan, operated by the East Japan Railway Company (JR East).

Lines
Tateyama Station is served by the Uchibō Line, and is located 85.9 km from the terminus of the line at Soga Station.

Station layout
The station consists of one side platform and one island platforms serving three tracks. The station has a Midori no Madoguchi staffed ticket office.

Platforms

History
The Hōjō Line was merged with the Bōsō Line in 1927. The station was renamed to its current name on March 1, 1946. Scheduled freight operations were suspended from November 15, 1982. The station was absorbed into the JR East network upon the privatization of the Japanese National Railways (JNR) on April 1, 1987. A new station building was completed in March 1999.

Bus terminal

Highway buses 
 Boso Nanohana; For Tokyo Station
 Shinjuku Nanohana; For Shinjuku Station
 Nanso Satomi; For Kisarazu-Hatorino, Soga Station, Chiba Station, Chiba-Chūō Station, and Chiba-Minato Station

Route buses 
Awa-Shirahama Bus Terminal

Passenger statistics
In fiscal 2019, the station was used by an average of 1599 passengers daily (boarding passengers only).

Surrounding area
 
 
 
Tateyama Port 
Tateyama City Hall
 JMSDF Tateyama Air Base
 Chiba Prefectural Awa High School

See also
 List of railway stations in Japan

References

External links

  JR East Station information 

Railway stations in Chiba Prefecture
Railway stations in Japan opened in 1919
Uchibō Line
Tateyama, Chiba